York Armory is a historic National Guard armory located at York, York County, Pennsylvania.  It was built in 1913, and is a two-story brick building executed in the Late Gothic Revival style. The drill hall is located on the second floor above the administrative area.  It is five bays by six bays in size.  A brick maintenance shop was added behind the building in the 1950s.

It was added to the National Register of Historic Places in 1989.

References

Armories on the National Register of Historic Places in Pennsylvania
Gothic Revival architecture in Pennsylvania
Infrastructure completed in 1913
Buildings and structures in York, Pennsylvania
1913 establishments in Pennsylvania
National Register of Historic Places in York County, Pennsylvania